Prafulla Chandra Pant (born 30 August 1952) is a retired Indian judge and author who served as a judge of the Supreme Court of India from 2014 to 2017. He also served as a member of the National Human Rights Commission of India from 2019 to 2021. Prior to his appointment as a judge of the Supreme Court of India, he had previously served as Chief Justice of Meghalaya High Court at Shillong and as a judge of Uttarakhand High Court at Nainital.

He is one of the few judges to have reached the apex court who joined judicial service as a civil judge junior division (Munsif). He was the first jurist from Uttarakhand to serve as a judge of Supreme Court of India. He was also the first Chief Justice of Meghalaya High Court to be elevated as Judge, Supreme Court of India.

Early life and education
Prafulla Chandra Pant was born on 30 August 1952 in Pithoragarh, Uttarakhand (then part of Uttar Pradesh state) to Ishwari Datt Pant and Pratima Pant. His father, I. D. Pant was a teacher who served as Principal of Bapu Government Inter College in Pithoragarh. He got his primary and secondary education from Mirthi in Pithoragarh and senior secondary education from Government Inter College, Pithoragarh. He graduated from Allahabad University with a degree of Bachelor of Science, followed by an LL.B.from Lucknow University in which he secured first division.

Pant, during his B.Sc. years wished to join the Armed Forces. He took the written examination of National Defence Academy (NDA) and qualified for the interview round, to be taken by the Services Selection Board (SSB), but ultimately was not selected by the board. Even when he was pursuing LL.B., he took the Combined Defence Services (CDS) exam and qualified the written examination, but again was rejected by the interview board.

Career

Advocacy 
Pant joined the Bar at Allahabad in 1973 and began practicing in the Allahabad High Court. As a novice, he learnt advocacy from learned advocates Ramesh Chandra Srivastava in 1974 and Vishnu Dayal Singh in 1975 respectively. He practiced advocacy primarily to gain a clear insight of the legal profession, not to set up a career out of it. He aspired to clear Munsif Services Examination (now PCS J) and endeavoured to become a judge.

Excise Inspector 
He took the UP Judicial Service Examination and before the declaration of its result also took the Excise Inspector exam and cleared it. He was posted at Sagar, Madhya Pradesh in the Central Excise and Customs department. He joined the office on 23 February 1976. On the same day, he tendered his resignation as Member of Bar Council of Uttar Pradesh and ceased to practice. During his course of employment as Central Excise Inspector, he caught two consignments of illegal tobacco and apprehended the persons who were later found guilty. On 5 December 1976, he was informed by the Uttar Pradesh government of his appointment as a Munsiff (Civil Judge Junior Division) in the Uttar Pradesh Judicial Service and thereafter, he submitted his resignation letter to the Central Excise department to join the judicial service.

District judiciary 
Pant entered into Uttar Pradesh Judicial Service in the year 1976 (through Uttar Pradesh Munsif Services Examination, 1973). He held different posts in Judicial Service at Ghaziabad, Pilibhit, Ranikhet, Bareilly and Meerut in Uttar Pradesh. Thereafter he was promoted to Uttar Pradesh Higher Judicial Service in 1990, and joined as Additional District Judge of the Bahraich district. He also worked as Joint Registrar in the High Court of Allahabad.

After creation of the new state of Uttarakhand, he served as the first Judicial Secretary of the state. He also held the post of District and Sessions Judge at Nainital district before being posted as Registrar General of the High Court of Uttarakhand at Nainital.

Uttarakhand High Court

He took oath of office of Additional Judge, High Court of Uttarakhand with effect from 29 June 2004, where after, he was confirmed on 19 February 2008, as a permanent Judge of the Uttarakhand High Court.

Meghalaya High Court
Pant took oath of office of Chief Justice of Meghalaya High Court at forenoon of 20 September 2013.

Pant served on the Court for almost 11 months and left for New Delhi after he was informed of his elevation to the Supreme Court of India.

Supreme Court 

On being further elevated he took oath of office of Judge, Supreme Court of India on 13 August 2014. After serving over 3 years as a judge of the Supreme Court of India, he demitted the office on 29 August 2017.

National Human Rights Commission of India 
He was appointed as a member of the National Human Rights Commission of India in April 2019. He joined the office on 22 April 2019.

After almost 5 months of retirement of NHRC Chairperson and former Chief Justice of India H. L. Dattu, he was appointed as the Acting Chairperson of the Commission on 25 April 2021 and continued as the Acting Chairperson till 1 June 2021. Pant, in March 2021 termed the vacant positions in NHRC and State Commissions as a "matter of concern".

He demitted the office on 11 September 2021.

Notable judgements

Yakub Memon's Appeal 
In an unprecedented overnight hearing at 3:20 am IST on 30 July 2015, a 3 judge bench comprising Dipak Misra, Prafulla Chandra Pant and Amitava Roy rejected 1993 Mumbai serial blasts convict Yakub Memon's appeal to stop his execution.

The bench said: "If we have to stay the death warrant, it would be a travesty of justice. We do not find any merit in the writ petition". Few hours later, Memon was hanged.

Defamation and Freedom of Speech 
In Subramanian Swamy v. Union of India. a two judge bench of the Supreme Court of India, which included Pant and Justice Dipak Misra, has upheld that defamation is a criminal offense. Many have seen the verdict as a blow to freedom of speech and expression in India.

Religious Conversion and Scheduled Caste Status 
In Mohammad Sadique vs Darbara Singh Guru, a bench of JJ Ranjan Gogoi and Prafulla Chandra Pant, quashed the order of Punjab and Haryana High Court, and upheld the claim of Mohammad Sadique to be a member of a Scheduled Caste (SC) and Punjab Legislative Assembly.

Guru in the Punjab Legislative Assembly elections of 2012 filed his nomination papers as a candidate of Shiromani Akali Dal whereas Sadique was a candidate from Indian National Congress. Both contested from the Bhadaur constituency of Punjab, which was reserved for Scheduled Castes. The outcome of the election was that Sadique won from Bhadaur and was elected Member of the Legislative Assembly. Guru challenged the outcome before the High Court of Punjab and Haryana pleading that Sadique professed Islam and so, could not be a member of the Scheduled Caste (SC), nor could he have contested from Bhadaur. The High Court delivered the verdict in Guru's favour, annulling his membership of State Legislature and held that he was a Muslim, not a member of Scheduled Caste. Aggrieved by the verdict, Sadique moved the Supreme Court.

In Supreme Court, a bench of JJ Ranjan Gogoi and Prafulla C Pant, observed that Sadique, even before his conversion to Sikhism, had inclination towards it and was a ‘Ragi’ and used to perform Kirtan at Alamgir Sikh Gurdwara. He even gave sufficient justification for why he did not change his name after his conversion to Sikhism, as he was already popular as a singer with that name. The bench noted, “A person can change his religion or faith but not the caste to which he belongs to, as caste has linkage to birth."  The bench believed that Sadique had become a Sikh, was a member of the 'Doom' community and thus, was also a member of the Scheduled Caste, allowing Sadique to function as a Member of Punjab Legislative Assembly for his remaining term.<ref>{{Cite web |last=Service |first=Tribune News |title=SC upholds Mohammad Sadiques election as MLA |url=https://www.tribuneindia.com/news/archive/features/sc-upholds-election-of-mohammad-sadique-as-mla-229497 |url-status=dead |archive-url=https://web.archive.org/web/20230317201507/https://www.tribuneindia.com/news/archive/features/sc-upholds-election-of-mohammad-sadique-as-mla-229497 |archive-date=18 March 2023 |access-date=2022-12-22 |website=Tribuneindia News Service |language=en}}</ref>

 Compromise in Rape 
In State of MP vs Madanlal, a bench of JJ Dipak Misra and Prafulla C. Pant held that there is no compromise legally permissible in rape cases between the accused and the victim, establishing that rape is a non-compoundable offence and it’s an offence against society which cannot be left for the parties to compromise and settle. A heinous crime such as rape, to be compromised or settled later would be against the honor of the victim and the society which matters the most.

 Gujarat Shrine Restoration 
He was a part of bench with Justice Dipak Misra, which held that destruction of places of worship by a dominant group is not a violation of Article 21 of the Indian Constitution, Right to life.

 Notable dissents 

 Corruption and Bail 
In a 2:1 judgment dated 16 August 2017, Pant penned the dissenting opinion in Rakesh Kumar Paul vs State of Assam passed by the Supreme Court over a case of alleged corruption.

 Personal life 
Prafulla Chandra Pant and his wife, Rashmi Pant were married on 10 June 1979. They have three daughters: Surabhi, Tanushree and Noopur. His wife has rarely appeared at social events and functions, however Pant has stated that, she had played her role silently in his career, supporting him.

 Works 
Pant has written many books on different subjects of law, few of which include:
Prafulla Chandra Pant. Marriage, Divorce and Other Matrimonial  Disputes Prafulla Chandra Pant. Sundar Nirnay Kaise Likhen (in Hindi) (lit. How To Write Good Judgements)
 Prafulla Chandra Pant and T. P. Gopalakrishnan. The Hindu Adoptions and Maintenance Act, 1956. Law Book Co., 1994
 Prafulla Chandra Pant and Somnath Aggarwal. Commentary On the Law of Maintenance''. Orient Publications New Delhi, 1995

His autobiography titled "Sangharsh Aur Bhagya" (in Hindi) was published in the year 2021.

References

External links

Official websites 
 Former Hon'ble Judges: Uttarakhand High Court
 Prafulla Chandra Pant: Meghalaya High Court
 Former Chief Justice & Judges: Supreme Court of India
 Prafulla Chandra Pant on National Human Rights Commission of India

Justices of the Supreme Court of India
Living people
20th-century Indian judges
1952 births
University of Lucknow alumni
People from Uttarakhand
People from Pithoragarh
People from Pithoragarh district
Judges of the Meghalaya High Court
21st-century Indian judges
University of Allahabad alumni
Chief Justices of the Meghalaya High Court
Indian legal writers